Chamkaur Sahib Assembly constituency is one of the 117 constituencies of the Punjab Legislative Assembly in the state of Punjab, India. It lies in Rupnagar district and is reserved for member of the Scheduled Castes.

Members of the Legislative Assembly

Election results

2022
:

2017 
Charanjit Singh Channi, who, in 2021, became the Chief Minister of Punjab, won the seat for third consecutive time.
:

2012
:

Previous results

See also
 List of constituencies of the Punjab Legislative Assembly
 Rupnagar district

References

External links
  

Assembly constituencies of Punjab, India
Rupnagar district